The 2021–22 Alpe Adria Cup was the sixth edition of this tournament which is organised after the cancellation of 2020-21 season due to the COVID-19 pandemic. Teams from six central european countries (Austria, Croatia, Czech Republic, Poland, Slovakia and Slovenia) competed this season.

Teams

Regular season

Group A

Group B

Group C

Group D

Playoffs 
In the playoffs, teams played against each other over two legs on a home-and-away basis, except for the Final Four. In the playoffs draw, the group winners are seeded, and the runners-up are unseeded. The seeded teams are drawn against the unseeded teams, with the seeded teams hosting the second leg.

References 

Alpe Adria Cup
A
2021–22 in Croatian basketball
2021–22 in Slovenian basketball
2021–22 in Slovak basketball
2021–22 in Austrian basketball
2021–22 in Czech basketball